Karim Haseleh may refer to:
 Karim Haseleh-ye Olya
 Karim Haseleh-ye Sofla